Patiria miniata, the bat star, sea bat, webbed star, or broad-disk star, is a species of sea star (also called a starfish) in the family Asterinidae. It typically has five arms, with the center disk of the animal being much wider than the stubby arms are in length. Although the bat star usually has five arms, it sometimes has as many as nine. Bat stars occur in many colors, including green, purple, red,  orange, yellow and  brown, either mottled or solid. The bat star gets its name from the webbing between its arms, which is said to resemble a bat's wings.

Its range extends from Sitka, Alaska to Baja California in the Pacific Ocean. It is most abundant along the coast of Central California and the Monterey Bay.

Classification
The genus of this species has transitioned back and forth between Asterina and Patiria since its inclusion in Fisher's 1911 North Pacific Asteroidea monograph. However, recent revisions based on molecular systematics have constrained Asterina and identified Patiria as a complex of three closely related species in the Pacific, including P. miniata, P. pectinifera in Asia and P. chilensis in South America.

Anatomy
Bat stars can be many different types of colors. The bat star breathes through gill-like structures on its back that perform as respirators. It lacks the  pincers  or pedicellariae that most starfish use to clean the skin surface of debris, but its small, moving hairs  or cilia may create enough of a water current to keep the surface of its skin clean. It has visual sensors at the end of each ray  that can detect light and note prey. To eat its prey,  it covers the prey with its stomach  and oozes  digestive juices over it; this liquefies the food, enabling the bat star to ingest it. It is omnivorous, eating both plants and animals alive or dead.

Reproduction

The bat stars reproduce through spawning. The male casts sperm and the female drops eggs; each has pores at the base of the rays for this purpose. The sperm and egg unite at sea and are carried away by ocean currents.

Behavior
Bat stars may gently "fight" with each other if they meet. Fighting behavior consists of pushing and laying an arm over the other.

Bat stars are important as detritivores and scavengers, collecting algae and  dead animals from the ocean floor.

References

Asterinidae
Fauna of the Pacific Ocean
Starfish described in 1835
Taxa named by Johann Friedrich von Brandt